KREC (98.1 FM) is a radio station broadcasting an adult contemporary format. Licensed to Brian Head, Utah, United States, the station serves the St. George area. It was built by Pam and Jeff Johnston and went on air in November 1988. They sold it in July 1999. The station is owned by Townsquare Media and features programming from Premiere Networks.

References

External links
star981.com
Cherry Creek Radio

REC
Townsquare Media radio stations